Robert Szczepański (born 1 June 1975) is a Polish boxer, powerlifter and strongman competitor. Prior to competing in strongman, Szczepański coached boxing and Powerlifting, and in 1993 he won a bronze medal in boxing at the Polish Junior Championships. Robert began competing in strongman in 2002. He has a wife, Magda, and a son Dorian (named after 6 time Mr. Olympia winner Dorian Yates).

Personal Records
 Squat 360 kg
 Bench Press 280 kg
 Deadlift 390 kg

Strongman
Robert Szczepański competed at the IFSA Strongman World Championships in 2005, 2006 and 2007. Robert finished ninth in 2005, sixth in 2006, and seventh in 2007. He finished fifth in the IFSA Strongman European Championships in 2005, and fourth in 2007. Recently, Robert finished second at the Giants Live Poland event on Aug. 8th, 2010. This second-place finish qualified him for the 2010 World's Strongest Man competition, this will be his first appearance at WSM.

Achievements
 2002
 5th place - Final Polish Strongman Cup 2002
 2nd place - Poland vs. Rest of World
 2003
 2nd place - Strongest Man World Cup 2003
 2nd place - Final Polish Strongman Cup 2003
 1st place - Poland vs. Rest of World
 2004
 1st place - Speedway Polish Strongman ECSS 2004
 2005
 5th place - IFSA Strongman European Championships 2005, Latvia
 9th place - IFSA Strongman World Championships 2005, Canada (injured)
 2006
 6th place - IFSA Strongman World Championships 2006 Iceland
 2007
 4th place - IFSA Strongman European Championships 2007, Ukraine
 7th place - IFSA Strongman World Championships 2007, South Korea
 7th place - World Team Cup 2007 (with Arthur stick), Lithuania
 2008
 1st place - European Cup Harlem's Strongest Man 2008
 2009
 1st place - Harlem Strongman Polish Cup 2009
 1st place - Polish Championship Strongman AS 2009
 1st place - Polish Strongman Cup Harlem 2009
 2010
 6th place - All-American Strongman Challenge 2010
2nd place - Giants Live Poland

References

1975 births
Living people
Polish powerlifters
Polish strength athletes
People from Więcbork
Sportspeople from Kuyavian-Pomeranian Voivodeship
Polish male boxers